Registered Scientist (RSci) is an extension to the Science Council's existing professional registers, that was introduced in 2012. This register extends the framework to allow professional recognition for higher technical roles. Holders of this qualification can use the post-nominal letters RSci. The Registered Scientist and Registered Science Technician (RSciTech), which was introduced at the same time, were developed with the support of the Gatsby Charitable Foundation.

The UK Government stated in their Plan for Growth that this type of accreditation allows employers to trust the abilities of graduates. This is due to the requirement of applicants to provide evidence that they meet specific competencies in their day to day role.

Licensed Bodies

The professional bodies highlighted below are all licensed to award Registered Scientist.
 Association for Science Education
 Institute of Biomedical Science
 Institute of Food Science and Technology
 Institute of Physics and Engineering in Medicine
 Institute of Science and Technology
 Institute of Water
 Institution of Chemical Engineers
 Royal Society of Chemistry
 Royal Society of Biology

References

Chemistry